"Focus" is a song by American singer H.E.R. released on September 8, 2016. It was included on her self-titled album released in 2017. A remix with Chris Brown, hosted by DJ Envy, was released on May 1, 2018, with Brown and H.E.R. exchanging verses.

Background
Justin Love, an artist from New Jersey who co-wrote the song, revealed that "Focus" is about his mother.

Pianist/Composer Andre Sims created composition Endless Minds in 2004, which the hit song Focus, performed by H.E.R, is derived from.

Commercial performance
"Focus" topped the Adult R&B Songs airplay chart in October 2018, becoming H.E.R.'s first number one a Billboard songs chart.

Accolades
"Focus" was nominated for the Soul Train Music Award for The Ashford & Simpson Songwriter's Award at the 2018 Soul Train Music Awards and for the Grammy Award for Best R&B Song at the 61st Annual Grammy Awards but lost both to "Boo'd Up" by Ella Mai.

Charts

Certifications

References

2016 songs
Songs written by Darhyl Camper
H.E.R. songs
Songs written by H.E.R.